Where the Buffalo Roam is a 1938 American Western film directed by Albert Herman (as Al Herman) and starring Tex Ritter.

Plot
Tex returns to Santa Fe to find his Mother murdered. Foster runs the town and all crimes committed by his gang are blamed on Rogel and his men. He makes Tex Marshal but this backfires when tex enlists Rogel and his men and goes after Foster who he now knows is responsible for his Mother's death.

Cast

Soundtrack
 Tex Ritter - "Where the Buffalo Roam" (Written by Frank Harford, Frank Sanucci and Tex Ritter)
 Tex Ritter - "Troubador of the Prairie" (Written by Frank Harford and Tex Ritter)
 Louise Massey and The Westerners - "In the Heart of the Prairie" (Written by Louise Massey and J. Woodruff Smith *Louise Massey and The Westerners1 - "Bunkhouse Jamboree" (Written by Louise Massey and Larry Wellington)
 Tex Ritter - "Longside of the Sana Fe Trail"
 Tex Ritter - "Home on the Range"
 Tex Ritter - "Shoot the Buffalo"

See also
 Public domain film
 List of American films of 1938
 List of films in the public domain in the United States

References

External links

1938 films
1930s action adventure films
1938 Western (genre) films
American black-and-white films
American action adventure films
American Western (genre) films
Films shot in Lone Pine, California
Films directed by Albert Herman
1930s English-language films
1930s American films